is a city in Aichi Prefecture, Japan. , the city had an estimated population of 73,420 in 31,276 households, and a population density of 980 persons per km2. The name of the city literally translates to "Dog Mountain". The name appears in historical records from 1336 AD, but it's origin is unknown.

Geography

Inuyama lies along the northwestern edge of Aichi Prefecture, separated from neighboring Gifu Prefecture by the Kiso River.

Climate
The city has a climate characterized by hot and humid summers, and relatively mild winters (Köppen climate classification Cfa).  The average annual temperature in Inuyama is 15.1 °C. The average annual rainfall is 1910 mm with September as the wettest month. The temperatures are highest on average in August, at around 27.6 °C, and lowest in January, at around 3.4 °C.

Demographics
Per Japanese census data, the population of Inuyama has been increasing over the past 70 years.

Surrounding municipalities
Aichi Prefecture
Kasugai
Komaki
Oguchi
Fuso
Gifu Prefecture
Tajimi
Kakamigahara
Kani
Sakahogi

History

Early modern period
The area around Inuyama was settled from prehistoric times. During the Sengoku period, part of the Battle of Komaki and Nagakute was fought in what is now Inuyama, and the Oda clan rebuilt a pre-existing fortification into Inuyama Castle.

Under the Edo period Tokugawa shogunate, Inuyama was ruled as a sub-domain of Owari Domain, entrusted to the Naruse clan, who served as senior retainers of the Nagoya-branch of the Tokugawa clan.

Late modern period
Immediately following the Meiji Restoration in 1868, Inuyama was established as an independent feudal han, until the 1871 abolition of the han system.
With the establishment of the modern municipalities system on October 1, 1889, the town of Inuyama was created.

Contemporary history
Inuyama Castle was designated as a national treasure in 1935 and again in 1952.

Inuyama merged with four neighboring villages to from the city of Inuyama on April 1, 1954.

In 2016, the Inuyama Festival was proclaimed an Intangible cultural heritage by UNESCO.

Government

Inuyama has a mayor-council form of government with a directly elected mayor and a unicameral city legislature of 20 members. The city contributes one member to the Aichi Prefectural Assembly.  In terms of national politics, the city is part of Aichi District 6 of the lower house of the Diet of Japan.

External relations

Twin towns – sister cities

Inuyama is twinned with:

International
Sister cities
Davis（California, United States of America）
Since February 3, 2001
Haman（South Gyeongsang Province, South Korea）
Since February 18, 2014
Friendship city
Xiangyang（Hubei, China）
Since March 3, 1983
Sankt Goarshausen（Rhineland-Palatinate, Germany）
Since June 1, 1992

National
Sister cities
Tateyama（Toyama Prefecture, Chūbu region）
Since October 16, 1973
Nichinan（Miyazaki Prefecture, Kyūshū region）
Since August 10, 2000
Kakamigahara（Gifu Prefecture, Chūbu region）
Since August 23, 2011
Tamba-Sasayama（Hyōgo Prefecture, Kansai region）
Since April 1, 2014

Economy

Secondary sector of the economy

Ceramic engineering
Inuyama ware is a type of Japanese pottery made in the town in a number of kilns.

Education

University
National Universities
Kyoto University（Primate Research Institute）
Private Universities
Nagoya Keizai University

Colleges
Private Colleges
Nagoya Keizai University Junior College

Schools
Inuyama has ten public elementary schools and four public junior high schools operated by the city government, and two public high schools operated by the Aichi Prefectural Board of Education.

Transportation

Railways

Conventional lines
 Meitetsu
Inuyama Line：-  -  - 
Komaki Line：-  -  - 
Hiromi Line： -  -  -

Roads

Japan National Route

Local attractions

Castles
 Inuyama Castle 
 ruins of Gakuden Castle
 ruins of Kinoshita Castle

Museums
 Meiji Mura, an open-air architectural museum for preserving and exhibiting structures of the Meiji (1867–1912) and Taishō (1913–1926) eras. As of 2005, 67 historical buildings are preserved on an area of 1,000,000 m2. The most famous one is the main entrance and lobby of Tokyo's old Imperial Hotel, designed by Frank Lloyd Wright and built in 1923.
Little World Museum of Man, an amusement park with an anthropological museum contained a large number of buildings built according to the native style of over 22 countries.

Natural attractions
 The Kiso River has some very picturesque rapids upstream of Inuyama Castle. These rapids and rock formations are called the Nihon Rhine after the Rhine river in Germany, and boat tours are available. Cormorant fishing on the Kiso River is nowadays almost exclusively done for tourists.
 Japan Monkey Park has different species of monkeys and other entertainment. Inuyama is the site of the Primate Research Institute of Kyoto University, one of the world's foremost centers for research in non-human primate biology and behavior. The chimpanzee Ai and her son Ayumu live there.
Lake Iruka, a reservoir listed by the International Commission on Irrigation and Drainage as a Heritage Irrigation Structure

Other structures
Urakuen tea garden, used for tea ceremonies. This garden contains the Jo-an tea house, built in 1618 by Oda Uraku (1547–1621), younger brother of Oda Nobunaga. Tea master Oda Uraku was a student of the famous tea master Sen no Rikyū. While the Jo-an tea house was originally built in Kyoto, it was moved to its current location in 1972. The building is considered one of the finest examples of tea house architecture.
Aigi Bridge, crossing the Kiso River into Kakamigahara in Gifu Prefecture

Culture

Cormorant fishing

Festival
Inuyama Festival

Notable people from Inuyama
Kaori Moritani, musician
Yashiro Rokurō, admiral in the Imperial Japanese Navy

References

External links 

 
 
 Inuyama City Tourist Association website

 
Cities in Aichi Prefecture